Saveria Chemotti (born April 5, 1947) is an Italian writer of non-fiction and prose. She is an essayist, novelist, and literary critic, as well as a researcher with a focus area of culture and gender studies.

Biography
Saveria Chemotti was born Madruzzo, Trentino, April 5, 1947. She earned a degree in literary subjects in 1972 (with a thesis on Antonio Gramsci as a critic of literature).

In 1981, she became a university researcher. Since 2003, she has been the rector's delegate for culture and gender studies and has organized the "Forum interdisciplinare per gli studi e la formazione di genere" (English interdisciplinary forum for gender studies and training) at the University of Padua.

Chemotti directed the series of gender studies, Soggetti rivelati. Ritratti, storie, scritture di donne (English: Revealed subjects. Portraits, stories, writings of women) (ed. Il Poligrafo) and Graphie (ed. Il Poligrafo), the narrative series Vicoli. Vie strette secondarie. Paesaggi letterari inesplorati (English: Vicoli. Narrow secondary streets. Unexplored literary landscapes) (ed. CLEUP), Destini incrociati (English: Crossed destinies( (ed. Il Poligrafo, 2021), and co-edited the six-monthly review of the history of contemporary Italian literature Studi novecenteschi (English: Twentieth Century Studies) (Pisa, Fabrizio Serra Editore).

She deals with Italian and European romanticism, fiction of the second half of the nineteenth and early twentieth centuries, culture and gender, as well as women's literature and authors, such as Ugo Foscolo, Antonio Gramsci, Tonino Guerra, and Giuseppe Berto.

Chemotti contributed to the reprint of the magazine, Argomenti (Arnaldo Forni Editore) and in 2011, she collaborated with the journalist Paolo Coltro on his collection of articles.

She edited the posthumous publication of some works by Antonietta Giacomelli (such as Vigilie and Sulla breccia) and Romano Pascutto (such as Il praetore delle baracche, La lodola morning, and Il viaggio). In 2013, Chemotti coordinated the cycle of lessons entitled, La Schola del Bo. La ricerca e l’esperienza culturale a disposizione della città (English: The Schola del Bo. Research and cultural experience available to the city) at the University of Padua.

Her work, La passione di una figlia ingrata (English: The Passion of an Ungrateful Daughter) (2014) was a finalist in the Narrative section of the Giovanni Comisso Literary Prize, 2015.

Selected works

Essays 
 A piè di pagina. Saggi di letteratura italiana, Padova, ed. Il Poligrafo, 2012, .
 Lo specchio infranto: la relazione tra padre e figlia in alcune scrittrici italiane contemporanee in collaboration with Regione del Veneto, Padova, ed. Il Poligrafo, 2010, .
 L'inchiostro bianco: madri e figlie nella narrativa italiana contemporanea, Padova, ed. Il Poligrafo, 2009, .
 La terra in tasca: esperienze di scrittura nel Veneto contemporaneo, ed. Il Poligrafo, 2003, .
 Il "limes" e la casa degli specchi. La nuova narrativa veneta, ed. University of Michigan, Padova, ed. Il Poligrafo, 1999, .
 Il mito americano: origine e crisi di un modello culturale, Padova, ed. CLEUP, 1980, .
 Gli intellettuali in trincea: politica e cultura nell'Italia del dopoguerra, introduction by Gian Piero Brunetta, Padova, ed. CLEUP, 1977, BN 778486.
 Umanesimo, rinascimento, Machiavelli nella critica gramsciana, Roma, ed. Bulzoni Editore, 1975, BN 764120.

Novels 
 Ti ho cercata in ogni stanza, ed. L'Iguana, 2016, .
 La passione di una figlia ingrata, ed. L'Iguana, 2014, .
Siamo tutte ragazze madri, ed. L'Iguana, 2018, .
A che punto è il giorno. Racconti, ed. Apogeo, 2019, .
Quella voce poco fa, ed. Jacobelli, 2019, .

Stories 
 M'ama? Mamme, madri, matrigne oppure no, edited by Annalisa Bruni, Saveria Chemotti and Antonella Cilento, Padova, ed. Il Poligrafo, 2008, .
 Il giogo dei ruoli (with Mario Coglitore), Il poligrafo, 2021.

References

1947 births
Living people
People from Trentino
21st-century Italian writers
21st-century Italian women writers
Italian essayists
Italian literary critics
Italian women essayists
Italian women literary critics
Gender studies academics
Academic staff of the University of Padua
21st-century Italian novelists
Italian women novelists